The Pennsylvania State Game Lands Number 189 are Pennsylvania State Game Lands in Beaver County in Pennsylvania in the United States providing hunting, bird watching, cross-country skiing, and other activities.

Geography
SGL 189 consists of two parcels. The larger parcel is located partially in Hanover Township and partially in Independence Township. The Game Lands falls within the Raccoon Creek watershed which is part of the Ohio River watershed. U.S. Route 30 passes along the southwest border of the main parcel and Pennsylvania Route 168 passes within  of the small parcel.

Statistics
It falls within the 15026 United States Postal Service zip code.

Biology
Hunting and furtaking species include coyote (Canis latrans), white-tailed deer (Odocoileus virginianus), gray fox (Urocyon cinereoargenteus), red fox (Vulpes Vulpes), ruffed grouse (Bonasa umbellus), mink (Neovison vison), muskrat (Ondatra zibethicus), Ring-necked pheasant (Phasianus colchicus), raccoon (Procyon lotor), gray squirrel, (Sciurus carolinensis), wild turkey (Meleagris gallopavo). An occasional bear (Ursus americanus) has been seen in the area.

See also
 Pennsylvania State Game Lands
 Pennsylvania State Game Lands Number 148, also located in Beaver County
 Pennsylvania State Game Lands Number 173, also located in Beaver County
 Pennsylvania State Game Lands Number 285, also located in Beaver County

References

189
Protected areas of Beaver County, Pennsylvania